Excess Baggage is a lost 1928 American silent comedy film directed by James Cruze and distributed by MGM. The film was based on the 1927 play of the same name by John McGowan.  The film starred William Haines, Josephine Dunn and Kathleen Clifford.

Cast
William Haines – Eddie Kane
Josephine Dunn – Elsa McCoy
Neely Edwards – Jimmy Dunn
Kathleen Clifford – Mabel Ford
Greta Granstedt – Betty Ford
Ricardo Cortez – Val D'Ierrico
Cyril Chadwick – Crammon
Delmer Daves (uncredited)

References

External links

 
 

1928 films
1928 comedy films
Silent American comedy films
American silent feature films
American black-and-white films
American films based on plays
Films directed by James Cruze
Lost American films
Metro-Goldwyn-Mayer films
1928 lost films
Lost comedy films
1920s American films